Flour is a powder made by grinding raw grains, roots, beans, nuts, or seeds. Flours are used to make many different foods. Cereal flour, particularly wheat flour, is the main ingredient of bread, which is a staple food for many cultures. Corn flour has been important in Mesoamerican cuisine since ancient times and remains a staple in the Americas. Rye flour is a constituent of bread in central and northern Europe.

Cereal flour consists either of the endosperm, germ, and bran together (whole-grain flour) or of the endosperm alone (refined flour). Meal is either differentiable from flour as having slightly coarser particle size (degree of comminution) or is synonymous with flour; the word is used both ways. For example, the word cornmeal often connotes a grittier texture whereas corn flour connotes fine powder, although there is no codified dividing line.

The CDC has cautioned not to eat raw flour doughs or batters. Raw flour can contain bacteria like E. coli and needs to be cooked like other foods.

Etymology 
The English word flour is originally a variant of the word flower, and both words derive from the Old French fleur or flour, which had the literal meaning "blossom", and a figurative meaning "the finest". The phrase fleur de farine meant "the finest part of the meal", since flour resulted from the elimination of coarse and unwanted matter from the grain during milling. Meal is either differentiable from flour as having slightly coarser particle size (degree of comminution) or is synonymous with flour; the word is used both ways. For example, the word cornmeal often connotes a grittier texture whereas corn flour connotes fine powder, although there is no codified dividing line.

History 

Corn flour has been important in Mesoamerican cuisine since ancient times and remains a staple in the Americas. Rye flour is a constituent of bread in central and northern Europe. Archaeological evidence for making flour (wheat seeds crushed between simple millstones) dates to at least 6000 BC. In 2018, archaeologists reported finding evidence of bread making at Shubayqa 1, a Natufian hunter-gatherer site more than 14,000 years old in northwest Jordan. The Romans were the first to grind seeds on cone mills. In 1786, at the beginning of the Industrial Era, the first steam-powered flour mill, Albion Mills, Southwark, was completed in London. In the 1930s, some flour began to be enriched with iron, niacin, thiamine and riboflavin. In the 1940s, mills started to enrich flour and folic acid was added to the list in the 1990s.

Degermed and heat-processed flour 
An important problem of the industrial revolution was the preservation of flour. Transportation distances and a relatively slow distribution system collided with natural shelf life. The reason for the limited shelf life is the fatty acids of the germ, which react from the moment they are exposed to oxygen. This occurs when grain is milled; the fatty acids oxidize and flour starts to become rancid. Depending on climate and grain quality, this process takes six to nine months. In the late 19th century, this process was too short for an industrial production and distribution cycle. As vitamins, micronutrients and amino acids were completely or relatively unknown in the late 19th century, removing the germ was an effective solution. Without the germ, flour cannot become rancid. Degermed flour became standard. Degermation started in densely populated areas and took approximately one generation to reach the countryside.
Heat-processed flour is flour where the germ is first separated from the endosperm and bran, then processed with steam, dry heat or microwave and blended into flour again.

Production 

Milling of flour is accomplished by grinding grain between stones or steel wheels. Today, "stone-ground" usually means that the grain has been ground in a mill in which a revolving stone wheel turns over a stationary stone wheel, vertically or horizontally with the grain in between.

Modern mills 

Roller mills soon replaced stone grist mills as the production of flour has historically driven technological development, as attempts to make gristmills more productive and less labor-intensive led to the watermill and windmill. These terms are now applied more broadly to uses of water and wind power for purposes other than milling. More recently, the Unifine mill, an impact-type mill, was developed in the mid-20th century.

Modern farm equipment allows livestock farmers to do some or all of their own milling when it comes time to convert their own grain crops to coarse meal for livestock feed. This capability is economically important because the profit margins are often thin enough in commercial farming that saving expenses is vital to staying in business.

Composition 

Flour contains a high proportion of starches, which are a subset of complex carbohydrates also known as polysaccharides. The kinds of flour used in cooking include all-purpose flour (known as plain outside North America), self-rising flour, and cake flour including bleached flour. The higher the protein content the harder and stronger the flour, and the more it will produce crispy or chewy breads. The lower the protein the softer the flour, which is better for cakes, cookies, and pie crusts. Cereal flour consists either of the endosperm, germ, and bran together (whole-grain flour) or of the endosperm alone (refined flour).

Bleached flour 

"Bleached flour" is "refined" flour with a chemical whitening (bleaching) agent added.  "Refined" flour has had the germ and bran, containing much of the nutritional fibre and vitamins, removed and is often referred to as "white flour".

Bleached flour is artificially aged using a "bleaching" agent, a "maturing" agent, or both. A bleaching agent affects the carotenoids responsible for the natural colour of the flour; a "maturing" agent also affects gluten development. A maturing agent may either strengthen or weaken gluten development.

Additives 
The four most common additives used as bleaching/maturing agents in the US are:
 Potassium bromate, listed as an ingredient, is a maturing agent that strengthens gluten development. It does not bleach.
 Benzoyl peroxide bleaches, but does not act as a maturing agent. It has no effect on gluten.
 Ascorbic acid (vitamin C) is listed as an ingredient, either as an indication that the flour was matured using ascorbic acid or that a small amount is added as a dough enhancer. It is a maturing agent that strengthens gluten development, but does not bleach.
 Chlorine gas is used as both a bleaching agent and a maturing agent. It weakens gluten development and oxidizes starches, making it easier for the flour to absorb water and swell, resulting in thicker batters and stiffer doughs. The retarded gluten formation is desirable in cakes, cookies, and biscuits, as it would otherwise make them tougher and bread-like. The modification of starches in the flour allows the use of wetter doughs (making for a moister end product) without destroying the structure necessary for light, fluffy cakes and biscuits. Chlorinated flour allows cakes and other baked goods to set faster and rise better, and the fat to be distributed more evenly, with less vulnerability to collapse.

Some other chemicals used as flour treatment agents to modify color and baking properties include:
 Chlorine dioxide (unstable to be transported in the U.S.)
 Calcium peroxide
 Azodicarbonamide or azobisformamide (synthetic)
 Atmospheric oxygen causes natural bleaching.

Common preservatives in commercial flour include:
 Calcium propanoate
 Sodium benzoate
 Tricalcium phosphate
 Butylated hydroxyanisole

Frequency of additives 
"Cake flour" in particular is nearly always chlorinated. At least one flour labeled "unbleached cake flour blend" (marketed by King Arthur Flour) is not bleached, and the protein content is much higher than typical cake flour at about 9.4% protein (cake flour is usually around 6% to 8%). According to King Arthur, this flour is a blend of a more finely milled unbleached wheat flour and cornstarch, which makes a better result than unbleached wheat flour alone (cornstarch blended with all-purpose flour is commonly substituted for cake flour when the latter is unavailable). The end product, however, is denser than would result from lower-protein, chlorinated cake flour.

All bleaching and maturing agents (with the possible exception of ascorbic acid) have been banned in the United Kingdom.

Bromination of flour in the US has fallen out of favor, and while it is not yet actually banned anywhere, few retail flours available to the home baker are bromated anymore.

Many varieties of flour packaged specifically for commercial bakeries are still bromated. Retail bleached flour marketed to the home baker is now treated mostly with either peroxidation or chlorine gas. Current information from Pillsbury is that their varieties of bleached flour are treated both with benzoyl peroxide and chlorine gas. Gold Medal states that their bleached flour is treated either with benzoyl peroxide or chlorine gas, but no way exists to tell which process has been used when buying the flour at the grocery store.

Enriched flour 

During the process of making flour, specifically as a result of the bleaching process, nutrients are lost. Some of these nutrients may be replaced during refining – the result is known as enriched flour.

Cake flour 
Cake flour is the lowest in gluten protein content, with 6-7% (5-8% from second source) protein to produce minimal binding so the cake "crumbles" easily.

Pastry flour 
Pastry flour has the second-lowest gluten protein content, with 7.5-9.5% (8-9% from second source) protein to hold together with a bit more strength than cakes, but still produce flaky crusts rather than hard or crispy ones.

Plain or all-purpose flour 
All-purpose, or "AP flour", or plain flour is medium in gluten protein content at 9.5-11.5% (10-12% from second source) protein content.  It has adequate protein content for many bread and pizza bases, though bread flour and special 00 grade Italian flour are often preferred for these purposes, respectively, especially by artisan bakers. Some biscuits are also prepared using this type of flour. "Plain" refers not only to AP flour's middling gluten content but also to its lack of any added leavening agent (as in self-rising flour).

Bread flour 
Bread flour is typically made from red hard wheat planted in the fall and harvested in the spring (winter wheat). Hard wheat is high in gluten, a protein that makes dough stretchy. Hard wheat is 11.5-13.5% (12-14% from second source) protein. The increased protein binds to the flour to entrap carbon dioxide released by the yeast fermentation process, resulting in a better rise and chewier texture.

Hard flour 
Hard is a general term for flours with high gluten protein content, commonly refers to extra strong flour, with 13.5-16% (or 14-15% from some sources) protein (16% is a theoretically possible protein content).  This flour may be used where a recipe adds ingredients that require the dough to be extra strong to hold together in their presence, or when strength is needed for constructions of bread (e.g., some centerpiece displays).

Gluten flour 
Gluten flour is refined gluten protein, or a theoretical 100% protein (though practical refining never achieves a full 100%). It is used to strengthen flour as needed.  For example, adding approximately one teaspoon per cup of AP flour gives the resulting mix the protein content of bread flour.  It is commonly added to whole grain flour recipes to overcome the tendency of greater fiber content to interfere with gluten development, needed to give the bread better rising (gas holding) qualities and chew.

Unbleached flour 
Unbleached flour is simply flour that has not undergone bleaching and therefore does not have the color of "white" flour. An example is graham flour, whose namesake, Sylvester Graham, was against using bleaching agents, which he considered unhealthy.

Self-raising flour 
In English-speaking countries, self-raising (or self-rising) flour is commercially available with chemical leavening agents already in the mix. In America, it is also likely to be pre-salted; in Britain this is not the case. The added ingredients are evenly distributed throughout the flour, which aids a consistent rise in baked goods. This flour is generally used for preparing sponge cakes, scones, muffins, etc. It was invented by Henry Jones and patented in 1845. If a recipe calls for self-raising flour, and this is not available, the following substitution is possible:
 1 cup (125 g) plain flour
 1 teaspoon (3 g) baking powder
 (US recipes) a pinch to  teaspoon (1 g or less) salt

Types

Gluten-containing flours

Wheat flour 

Wheat is the grain most commonly used to make flour. Certain varieties may be referred to as "clean" or "white". Flours contain differing levels of the protein gluten. "Strong flour" or "hard flour" has a higher gluten content than "weak" or "soft" flour. "Brown" and wholemeal flours may be made of hard or soft wheat.
 Atta flour is a whole-grain wheat flour important in Indian and Pakistani cuisine, used for a range of breads such as roti and chapati. It is usually stone-ground to coarse granules, which gives it a texture not easily found in other flatbreads.
 Common wheat flour (T. aestivum) is the flour most often used for making bread. Durum wheat flour (T. durum) is the second most used.
 Maida flour is a finely milled wheat flour used to make a wide variety of Indian breads such as paratha and naan. Maida is widely used not only in Indian cuisine but also in Central Asian and Southeast Asian cuisine. Though sometimes referred to as "all-purpose flour" by Indian chefs, it more closely resembles cake flour or even pure starch. In India, maida flour is used to make pastries and other bakery items such as bread, biscuits and toast.
 Noodle flour is a special blend of flour used for the making of Asian-style noodles, made from wheat or rice.
 Semolina is the coarse, purified wheat middlings of durum wheat used in making pasta, breakfast cereals, puddings, and couscous.
 Spelt, an ancient grain, is a hexaploid species of wheat. Spelt dough needs less kneading than common wheat or durum wheat dough. Compared to hard-wheat flours, spelt flour has a relatively low (six to nine percent) protein count, just a little higher than pastry flour. That means that plain spelt flour works well in creating dough for soft foods such as cookies or pancakes. Crackers turn out well because they are made from dough that does not need to rise when baked.

Other varieties 

 Rye flour is used to bake the traditional sourdough breads of Germany, Austria, Switzerland, Russia, Czech Republic, Poland and Scandinavia. Most rye breads use a mix of rye and wheat flours because rye does not produce sufficient gluten. Pumpernickel bread is usually made exclusively of rye, and contains a mixture of rye flour and rye meal. Secale flower is used to make bread such as Prądnik bread.

Gluten-free flours 
When flours do not contain gluten, they are suitable for people with gluten-related disorders, such as coeliac disease, non-celiac gluten sensitivity or wheat allergy sufferers, among others. Contamination with gluten-containing cereals can occur during grain harvesting, transporting, milling, storing, processing, handling and/or cooking.
 Acorn flour is made from ground acorns and can be used as a substitute for wheat flour. It was used by Native Americans. Koreans also use acorn flour to make dotorimuk.
 Almond flour is made from ground almonds.
 Amaranth flour is a flour produced from ground amaranth grain. It was commonly used in pre-Columbian meso-American cuisine and was originally cultivated by the Aztecs. It is becoming more and more available in speciality food shops.
 Apple flour is made from milling apple pomace, the solid remains of juiced apples.
 Banana flour has been traditionally made of green bananas for thousands of years and is currently popular both as a gluten-free replacement for wheat flour and as a source of resistant starch.
 Bean flour is a flour produced from pulverized dried or ripe beans. Garbanzo and fava bean flour is a flour mixture with a high nutritional value and strong aftertaste.
 Brown rice flour is of great importance in Southeast Asian cuisine. Edible rice paper can be made from it.
 Buckwheat flour is used as an ingredient in many pancakes in the United States. In Japan, it is used to make a popular noodle called soba. In Russia, buckwheat flour is added to the batter for pancakes called blinis which are frequently eaten with caviar. Buckwheat flour is also used to make crêpes bretonnes in Brittany. On Hindu fasting days (Navaratri mainly, also Maha Shivaratri), people eat food made with buckwheat flour. The preparation varies across India. The most famous dishes are kuttu ki puri and kuttu pakora. In most northern and western states the usual term is kuttu ka atta.
 Cassava flour is made from the root of the cassava plant. In a purified form (pure starch), it is called tapioca flour (see in list below).
 Chestnut flour is popular in Corsica, the Périgord, and Lunigiana for breads, cakes and pastas. It is the original ingredient for polenta, still used as such in Corsica and other Mediterranean locations. Chestnut bread keeps fresh for as long as two weeks. In other parts of Italy it is mainly used for desserts.
 Chickpea flour (also known as gram flour or besan) is of great importance in Indian cuisine, and in Italy, where it is used for the Ligurian farinata.
 Chuño flour is made from dried potatoes in various countries of South America.
 Coconut flour is made from ground coconut meat and has the highest fiber content of any flour, having a very low concentration of digestible carbohydrates and thus making an excellent choice for those looking to restrict their carbohydrate intake. It also has a high fat content of about 60 percent.
 Coffee flour is flour usually made with either coffee cherries or coffee beans.
 Corn (maize) flour is popular in the Southern and Southwestern US, Mexico, Central America, and Punjab regions of India and Pakistan, where it is called makai ka atta. Coarse whole-grain corn flour is usually called cornmeal. Finely ground corn flour that has been treated with food-grade lime is called masa harina (see masa) and is used to make tortillas and tamales in Mexican cooking. Corn flour should never be confused with corn starch, which is known as "cornflour" in British English.
 Cornmeal is very similar to corn flour (see above) except in a coarser grind.
 Corn starch is starch extracted from endosperm of the corn kernel.
 Glutinous rice flour or sticky rice flour is used in east and southeast Asian cuisines for making tangyuan, etc.
 Hemp flour is produced by pressing the oil from the hemp seed and milling the residue. Hemp seed is approximately 30 percent oil and 70 percent residue. Hemp flour does not rise, and is best mixed with other flours. Added to any flour by about 15-20 percent, it gives a spongy nutty texture and flavor with a green hue.
 Mesquite flour is made from the dried and ground pods of the mesquite tree, which grows throughout North America in arid climates. The flour has a sweet, slightly nutty flavor and can be used in a wide variety of applications.
 Nut flours are grated from oily nuts—most commonly almonds and hazelnuts—and are used instead of or in addition to wheat flour to produce more dry and flavorful pastries and cakes. Cakes made with nut flours are usually called tortes and most originated in Central Europe, in countries such as Hungary and Austria.
 Peasemeal or pea flour is a flour produced from roasted and pulverized yellow field peas.
 Peanut flour made from shelled cooked peanuts is a high-protein alternative to regular flour.
 Potato starch flour is obtained by grinding the tubers to a pulp and removing the fibre and protein by water-washing. Potato starch (flour) is very white starch powder used as a thickening agent. Standard (native) potato starch needs boiling, to thicken in water, giving a transparent gel. Because the flour is made from neither grains nor legumes, it is used as a substitute for wheat flour in cooking by Jews during Passover, when grains are not eaten.
 Potato flour, often confused with potato starch, is a peeled, cooked potato powder of mashed, mostly drum-dried and ground potato flakes using the whole potato and thus containing the protein and some of the fibres of the potato. It has an off-white slight yellowish color. These dehydrated, dried, potatoes, also called instant mashed potatoes can also be granules or flakes. Potato flour is cold-water-soluble; however, it is not used often as it tends to be heavy.
 Rice flour is ground kernels of rice. It is widely used in Western countries especially for people who suffer from gluten-related disorders. Brown rice flour has higher nutritional value than white rice flour.
 Sorghum flour is made from grinding whole grains of the sorghum plant. It is called jowar in India.
 Tapioca flour, produced from the root of the cassava plant, is used to make breads, pancakes, tapioca pudding, a savoury porridge called fufu in Africa, and is used as a starch.
 Teff flour is made from the grain teff, and is of considerable importance in eastern Africa (particularly around the horn of Africa). Notably, it is the chief ingredient in the bread injera, an important component of Ethiopian cuisine.

More types 

Flour also can be made from soybeans, arrowroot, taro, cattails, acorns, manioc, quinoa, and other non-cereal foodstuffs.

Type numbers   
This is an easily verified indicator for the fraction of the whole grain remains in the flour, because the mineral content of the starchy endosperm is much lower than that of the outer parts of the grain. Flour made from all parts of the grain (extraction rate: 100%) leaves about  ash or more per  dry flour.
 German flour type numbers indicate the amount of ash (measured in milligrams) obtained from 100 g of the dry mass of this flour. Standard wheat flours (defined in DIN 10355) range from type 405 for normal white wheat flour for baking, to strong bread flour types 550, 812, and the darker types 1050 and 1600 for wholegrain breads.
 French flour type numbers are a factor of 10 smaller than those used in Germany, because they indicate the ash content (in milligrams) per 10 g flour. Type 55 is the standard, hard-wheat white flour for baking, including puff pastries. Type 45 is often called pastry flour, and is generally from a softer wheat (this corresponds to what older French texts call ). Some recipes use type 45 for croissants, for instance, although many French bakers use type 55 or a combination of types 45 and 55. Types 65, 80, and 110 are strong bread flours of increasing darkness, and type 150 is a wholemeal flour.
 Czech flour types describes roughness of milling instead of amount of ash, though sometimes a numbering system is used, it is not a rule. Czechs determine following four basic types of mill: extra soft wheat flour (00), soft wheat flour (T650), fine wheat flour, rough wheat flour and farina wheat flour
 Argentine flour uses roughness of milling as well, being 0, 00, 000 and 0000, where the number of zeroes indicates its refinement.
 Polish flour type numbers, as is the case in Germany, indicate the amount of ash in 100 g of the dry mass of the flour. Standard wheat flours (defined by the PKN in PN-A-74022:2003) range from type 450 to 2000.

In the United States and the United Kingdom, no numbered standardized flour types are defined, and the ash mass is only rarely given on the label by flour manufacturers. However, the legally required standard nutrition label specifies the protein content of the flour, which is also a way for comparing the extraction rates of different available flour types.

In general, as the extraction rate of the flour increases, so do both the protein and the ash content. However, as the extraction rate approaches 100% (whole meal), the protein content drops slightly, while the ash content continues to rise.

The following table shows some typical examples of how protein and ash content relate to each other in wheat flour:

This table is only a rough guideline for converting bread recipes. Since flour types are not standardized in many countries, the numbers may differ between manufacturers. There is no French type corresponding to the lowest ash residue in the table. The closest is French Type 45.

There is no official Chinese name corresponding to the highest ash residue in the table. Usually such products are imported from Japan and the Japanese name Zenryufun (全粒粉) is used, or it is called QuanMaiMianFen (全麥麵粉).

It is possible to determine ash content from some US manufacturers. However, US measurements are based on wheat with a 14% moisture content. Thus, a US flour with 0.48% ash would approximate a French Type 55.

Other measurable properties of flour as used in baking can be determined using a variety of specialized instruments, such as the farinograph.

Dangers

Flammability 
Flour dust suspended in air is explosive—as is any mixture of a finely powdered flammable substance with air (see dust explosion). Some devastating explosions have occurred at flour mills, including an explosion in 1878 at the Washburn "A" Mill in Minneapolis that killed 22 people.

Pathogens 
The CDC has cautioned not to eat raw flour doughs or batters. Raw flour can contain bacteria like E. coli and needs to be cooked like other foods.

Products 
Bread, pasta, crackers, many cakes, and many other foods are made using flour. Wheat flour is also used to make a roux as a base for thickening gravy and sauces.
It can also be used as an ingredient in papier-mâché glue.

Cornstarch is a principal ingredient used to thicken many puddings or desserts, and is the main ingredient in packaged custard.

See also

 Groat (grain)

Notes

References 

 The Bread and Flour Regulations 1998, United Kingdom

External links 

 
 Flourworld Museum

 
Wheat
Staple foods
Food additives